The Vienna Generating Station is a 167 MW oil-fired electric generating plant owned by NRG Energy, located in Vienna, Maryland.

See also
List of power stations in Maryland

References

Oil-fired power stations in Maryland
Buildings and structures in Dorchester County, Maryland
NRG Energy